Kokkuvil is a suburb in the northern Sri Lankan city of Jaffna.

Transport 
 Kokuvil railway station

Schools 
 Kokuvil Hindu College

Notable People

Appadurai Muttulingam - Popular Tamil Writer

References

Towns in Jaffna District
Nallur DS Division
Suburbs of Jaffna